Yuri Salnikov (born 6 June 1950) is a former Soviet equestrian and Olympic champion. He won a team gold medal in eventing at the 1980 Summer Olympics in Moscow.

References

1950 births
Living people
Russian male equestrians
Soviet male equestrians
Olympic equestrians of the Soviet Union
Equestrians at the 1976 Summer Olympics
Equestrians at the 1980 Summer Olympics
Olympic gold medalists for the Soviet Union
Olympic bronze medalists for the Soviet Union
Event riders
Olympic medalists in equestrian
Medalists at the 1980 Summer Olympics